Thoppul Kodi is a 2011 Indian Tamil-language film co-written and directed by Sri Jeyan, and starring Jagan and Swapna. The music was directed by Thomas Rathnam.

Cast
 Jagan as Refugee
 Swapna

Production
The film was produced by World Tamil Talkies.

Soundtrack
The film's soundtrack, composed by Thomas Rathnam, was released on 2 June 2011.

Songs

Ambarai vayalukkula  – Anuradha Sriram, Dr. Vincent Theraisnathan
Antharathil aadum usiru than – Manicka Vinayagam
Sinna ponnu pora – Cylon Manohar
Vazhvaa sava – Mukesh, J. Kevin Jason
Uyirodu uyirondru – Palani, Jenifer

References

2011 films
2010s Tamil-language films